The wedge-snouted skink or sharp-lipped mabuya (Trachylepis acutilabris) is a species of skink found in Namibia, Angola, Democratic Republic of the Congo, and South Africa.

References

Trachylepis
Reptiles of Angola
Reptiles of the Democratic Republic of the Congo
Reptiles of Namibia
Reptiles of South Africa
Reptiles described in 1862
Taxa named by Wilhelm Peters